The Chennai Mass Rapid Transit System, a state-owned subsidiary of Indian Railways, is a metropolitan elevated railway line in Chennai, India. Operated by the Southern Railways, it is the first elevated railway line in India and also the country's longest elevated corridor spanning 17 km. Although it is segregated from the Chennai Suburban Railway, they both are operated by Southern Railway and are integrated in a wider urban rail network. Connecting the central business area of old Madras with the IT corridor, the section has a potential capacity of 425,000 passengers a day. In 2011–2012, MRTS registered a revenue of  198.9 million, registering a 16.25 percent increase, with 134 trains plying across all the 17 stations.

The MRTS is planned to be taken over by the Chennai Metro Rail Limited in upcoming years, thereby bringing all the elevated tracks and underground tracks inside the city under one organisation.

History

Planning
The well-established Chennai Suburban Railway network, which dates back to 1931, began services on the metre gauge line from Beach to Tambaram. Two more suburban networks, Chennai Central–Arakkonam and Chennai Central–Gummidipoondi began operations in 1985 from the then newly built Moore market complex annex of the Chennai Central railway station. In 1965, the Planning Commission set up a study team on metropolitan transport to assess the adequacy and limitation of existing transport facilities in the cities of Calcutta, Bombay, Madras and Delhi to determine the feasibility of different modes of transport and recommend phased programmes for development of transport facilities. In a means to supplement the existing suburban rail network in Chennai, a number of surveys were conducted in the 1960s including the surveys by the Madras Area Transportation Study Unit (MATSU), which was set up by the Planning Commission during 1968–1970 and the Metropolitan Transport Project (MTP), which was established by Indian Railways in July 1971. The surveys and studies identified eight important transport corridors, including the 39-km north–southeastern rail corridor along the Buckingham Canal. These were soon followed by a feasibility study conducted by RITES, an engineering and infrastructure enterprise of the Government of India, on behalf of the state government. The study results were submitted in 1975, suggesting a rail-based mass transit system between Kasturba Nagar and Manali Road.

The system was envisaged as a  loop line passing through Chennai Beach and Tiruvottiyur. In the 1980s, the government began planning for a new railway line inside the city. The suburban lines offered no connectivity to Central and South Madras (as the city was known then). Planning began in 1984.

Since the rail line passes through congested parts of the city, an elevated rail system with an alignment along the Buckingham Canal was selected, as it would avoid land-acquisition problems. The MTP intended to implement the project in four phases:
 First phase: From Beach to Tirumailai (Mylapore)
 Second phase: From Tirumailai to St. Thomas Mount
 Third phase: From St. Thomas Mount to Villivakkam
 Fourth phase: From Villivakkam to Ennore
Fifth phase from Perungudi MRTS station to Kalpakkam via Mamallapuram

However, the current line is slated to not extend past St. Thomas Mount, as the Chennai Metro project is slated to use a similar alignment.

Construction and opening
Although the present system was planned in the 1970s and the 1980s, the project was taken up for implementation by the Government of India, Ministry of Railways in 1983–84 at an estimated cost of  534.6 million, it took nearly a decade for the first phase to construct and begin operation. Construction began in earnest in 1991. After many delays, the first phase was operational from Beach up to Chepauk in 1995 as the first elevated railway line in India, and it was extended to Thirumayilai station in Mylapore in 1997. When the first phase between Chennai Beach and Thirumyilai opened in 1997, the project cost  2,690 million, compared to the initial estimate of  550 million in 1984. The patronage of the first phase turned out to be way lesser than the over-reckoned value of 603,000 passengers per day. In 1998, the Railway Board accorded sanction of executing Phase II of the project from Thirumayilai to Velachery.

The second phase of the project was taken up on the basis of the study conducted by RITES during 1987 and 1994 and taking into account population growth and the capacity of public transport system. The MRTS services were extended from Thirumaylai to Thiruvanmiyur on 27 June 2004, as part of its second phase. On 19 November 2007, the network was further extended from Thiruvanmiyur to Velachery at a cost of  7,690 million. The extended second phase of the project, connecting Velachery with St. Thomas Mount, is currently underway. However, changes to its original alignment have drawn fierce opposition from residents, some of whom have been asked to relocate.

The progress of different phases of the line is summarised in the following table:

Funding pattern
Phase I from Beach to Tirumailai was fully funded by the Southern Railways, and the state government gave the required land free of cost. Phase II between Tirumailai and Velachery was implemented with the state government bearing two-thirds of the project cost. For the extension of Phase II to St. Thomas Mount, the ratio remains the same as Phase II.

Timeline
1965 the Planning Commission was set up
1975 RITES completed its feasibility study and submitted it to railways department
1987 feasibility study for phase 2 started
1991 Phase 1 of chennai MRTS construction begins
1994 phase 2 feasibility study completed
1995 phase 1 of chennai MRTS project completed partially and opened for traffic till chepauk. First elevated railway line in the country after its inauguration. It will be the second mass rapid transit system in india, Kolkata metro stands first.
1997 MRTS phase 1 completed fully till Thirumayilai and opened for traffic.
1998 The Railway Board accorded sanction of executing Phase II of the project from Thirumayilai to Velachery.
27 June 2004 The MRTS services were extended from Thirumaylai to Thiruvanmiyur on as part of its second phase
19 November 2007 the network was further extended from Thiruvanmiyur to Velachery
 July 2011 Construction of the stations begins. 
 July 2012 According to the Railway Budget 2012, the section would be commissioned by December 2013. 
 October 2012 Land acquisition by CMDA has resumed after the Madras High court vacated a stay and construction work is expected to resume once the acquired land is transferred to the Railways. Land acquisition on the 5-km stretch resumed to be completed in 45 days.
 April 2013 expected to be completed by February 2013 but legal wrangles continue to obstruct the development
 July 2013 The extension of the network has hit a cul de sac near Thillai Ganga Nagar due to difficulty in procuring the land from the locals. 
 May 2014 3.7 km of the 5-km stretch of the MRTS line completed. Work is expected to resume, in a month, after the beneficiaries who had approached the High Court against the acquisition of 500 metres of land are expected to be compensated under the Indian government's new Land Acquisition Act, that came into effect on 2014, replacing a 119-year-old obsolete legislation. 
 October 2014 Few of the residents again approached court demanding higher compensation, based on the Land Acquisition Act 2013 - that came into force from 1 January 2014. 
 July 2015 As many as 18 cases filed in Madras High Court to fix the compensation under the new Land Acquisition Act - and the project was not expected to be complete before December, 2016. 
 6 August 2015 the High Court directed the authorities to follow the new law enacted in 2013 that gave better compensation to land owners and to complete the exercise as expeditiously as possible and not later than three months.
 November 2015 Revenue Officials state that land acquisition process had been put on hold as they were engaged in flood-relief work.
 March 2016 Southern Railway General Manager states that MRTS final phase will take at least 18 more months from the date of receiving land (for the last 500 meters) from State Government – which is yet to start the process of acquiring land as per new rates.
 November 2018  discussion between residents and Chennai Metropolitan Development Authority fails again
 January 2019  Court dismisses a batch of 40 petitions challenging land acquisition for the project
 July 2019  In nine months,  MRTS extends the service up to Adambakkam
 August 2019 Railway Minister Piyush Goyal assures MRTS completion in 18 months
January 2020 Land acquisition problems still continued by Land owners even after the court's order
10 September 2020 Railway officials plans to operate shuttle services in-between the completed stretch of Adambakkam to Velacherry MRTS.
21 September 2020 CMDA Officials Filed a case regarding the Land acquisition once again
31 December 2020 Finally the Buildings present in the last 500 m stretch gets demolished and the land is being ready to handed over to Indian railways for Construction of the last 500 m stretch, and announced soon tender will be floated.
13 January 2021 Commissioner of Rail Safety (CRS) Plans to make an inspection on end of February as requested by the southern railways. Inspection will be done on the completed stretch till Adambakkam Railway Station.
 19 February 2021 Court rejected the case filed by the state government of Tamil Nadu(CMDA) which caused hindrance in Land acquisition and compensation on last 500m stretch. Puzhuthivakkam and Adambakkam Railway stations are nearing completion. Southern Railways plans to extend chennai MRTS till st. Thomas Mount by 2022 and tenders for the construction of last 500m will be floated soon with a construction time of 18 months.
28 December 2021 Indian Railways Plans to operationalize this phase 2-B stretch within 2022
01 November 2022 Southern Railways - MRTS connectivity from Velachery to St Thomas Mount to be ready by March 2023

Infrastructure

Route
The Chennai MRTS route is largely elevated, with at-grade sections at its terminals. From Beach to Chennai Park Town station, the line runs at grade, parallel to the suburban railway network. Following Chennai Park Town station, the line's first phase becomes elevated and follows the course of the Buckingham Canal, which runs parallel to the Coromandel Coast. The line remains elevated for the alignment of the second phase up to Perungudi, after which it returns to an at-grade section at Velachery. The ongoing  extension of the line from Velachery to St. Thomas Mount is also elevated.

Minor change in the alignment

In 2001, the Chennai Metropolitan Development Authority (CMDA) proposed a realignment of the MRTS route to St. Thomas Mount and combined it with the Inner Ring Road because it faced difficulties with land acquisition. The Government of Tamil Nadu accepted it in 2006, and an order confirming the changes was passed. About 186 hectares of land that were frozen from development till then were released. However, the alignment was changed further as the Department of Highways deviated from the approved alignment of the Inner Ring Road without consulting the CMDA or the Metropolitan Transport Project (MTP–Railways).

Stations
Snaking through the central region of Chennai, the alignment covers several significant landmarks of the city and currently has 18 stations. The Chennai Beach station is a hub terminal for several suburban trains, and, along with Chennai Fort station, it serves the commercial locations of Broadway and Parry's Corner. Chennai Park Town station is located opposite Chennai Central, which is a hub for both long-distance express trains and suburban trains. Places of tourist interests such as Parthasarathy Temple and Kapaleeshwarar Temple are located close to Thiruvallikeni and Thirumayilai MRTS stations, respectively. Marina Beach spans along the stretch of the Thiruvallikeni and Light House stations, in addition to the Chepauk station, which lies abutting the Chepauk Stadium. The MRTS also passes through those areas of Chennai where the information technology (IT) industry is located—while the Kasturba Nagar, Thiruvanmiyur and Indira Nagar stations are located on the IT corridor, the neighbourhoods of Perungudi, Taramani and Velachery also have IT establishments. The St. Thomas Mount station at the southern end of the alignment, upon completion, will have three different types of railway networks, namely, the suburban and long-distance express trains plying on the conventional tracks at grade level, the MRTS elevated station at level 1 and the Chennai Metro Rail at level 2.

Each station is designed by a different architect and is built to accommodate a 9-car train. Most stations also feature two-side platforms.

Design

In many aspects, the Chennai MRTS bears greater resemblance to the Chennai Suburban Railway as opposed to a true rapid transit line. MRTS uses the same gauge as the suburban system, thus allowing the movements of passengers between the existing suburban lines and the MRTS. Owing to this reason, the trains run on the MRTS are 'normal' EMUs and do not have automatic doors like a metro train. Ballastless track is used between Tirumailai and Velachery. The elevated tracks are built at an average height of about 14 metres from the ground.

Plans for using the empty space at MRTS stations
There are various plans to use the empty space in the MRTS stations.

 Food stalls at MRTS stations
In February 2009, IRCTC envisaged to set up food stalls at 12 MRTS stations. But the food stalls have not materialised hitherto.

In September 2013, the IRCTC decided to initially set up food stalls at three key MRTS stations Tirumailai (Mylapore), Thiruvanmiyur and Velachery with multiple shops and serve multi-cuisine food similar to the setup at Chennai Central railway station.

In April 2018, IRCTC opened the first food plaza at Thiruvanmiyur MRTS station. Then IRCTC opened two more fast food joints on the ground floor of the Thirumayilai station and near the platform of Taramani station.

In February 2020, IRCTC has opened a food court at the Velachery MRTS station. The food court, located adjacent to the entrance of the railway station, serve all kinds of vegetarian and non-vegetarian dishes, and was inaugurated by P. Mahesh, Divisional Railway Manager, Chennai division.

Proposal of Amma Unavagams at MRTS stations
In October 2013, there are plans to open Amma Unavagams, the subsidised canteens run by the Tamil Nadu government, in the huge empty space of MRTS stations.

Commercial exploitation of the space in MRTS stations is not a new idea. However, over the years, many projects have failed to take off. Some years ago, CMDA had proposed the exploitation of space in nine stations across 11.16 km of the second phase of MRTS.

Operations

Hours of operation and frequencies 

The first train departs from Chennai Beach at 4:15 am, and the last one departs at 9:35 pm. From Velachery, the first train departs at 5:00 am to Chennai beach, with the last train departing Velachery at 10:20 pm. On Sundays, a total of 51 trips are operated. In the peak hours, nine-car trains are used, while six-car trains are operated during the remaining time. Nine-car rakes were introduced in 2008. All services, on the MRTS, were upgraded to 9 cars from Aug-2015 onwards.
Two additional services promised in 2012 Railway Budget were introduced only in July 2013.

Extension
In July 2016, the Southern Railway extended suburban electric multiple unit (EMU) services from the Mass Rapid Transit System (MRTS) section to Tiruvallur and Gummidipoondi, and later to Arakkonam.

Patronage

The line currently transports less than 25 percent of its projected passenger capacity. The MRTS experiences a ridership of 78,000 commuters during weekdays and Saturdays. However, there has been a ridership increase from approximately 25,000 people in 2000 and 66,518 people in 2008. Incidentally, when the MRTS was extended up to Velachery in 2007, it saw a three-fold increase in the revenue. As of July 2015 the ridership is at 100,000 commuters a day. Commuters point out that the MRTS services could see higher patronage if the railway stations have better bus connectivity, proper maintenance and enough lighting and security.

Of the system's 18 stations, Chennai Park Town, Thirumayilai, Thiruvanmiyur and Velachery account for nearly 40 percent of the ridership. In a measure to increase patronage, the MRTS had adopted several schemes to draw potential passengers.

As the route passes close to some of the most famous temples of Chennai, the MRTS operates special trains during popular religious festivals such as the Vaikunta Ekadashi at Parthasarathy Temple in Triplicane and Arupathumoovar at the Kapaleeshwarar Temple in Mylapore. Special trains are also run during cricket matches at the M. A. Chidambaram Stadium at Chepauk, and air shows and Kaanum Pongal at the Marina Beach and bus strikes.

Finances
For the 10-month period from April 2009 to January 2010, the MRTS earned a total revenue of  127.6 million: with a fare revenue of ( 122.1 million from ticketing sales,  2.6 million from advertisement sales and  2.9 million from parking contracts). This is compared with an estimated operating expense of about  230 million.  The operational cost of the entire stretch is about  1.8 million per day while revenue generated amounts to only  0.3 million per day.

The average number of passengers and the revenue generated per day over the past years are listed below:

The MRTS network registered a 16.25-percent increase in revenue to  198.9 million in 2011–2012 period.

Fares and ticketing

The fare structure of the Chennai MRTS is integrated with that of the Chennai Suburban Railway, as both are operated by the Southern Railways. Unlike most rapid transit systems, and like the Chennai Suburban Railway, the Chennai MRTS maintains first-class passenger seating and does not have air-conditioned coaches. 
In addition to the fare scheme listed in the table, which is meant for one-time ticketed travel, the Southern Railways has monthly tickets and quarterly season tickets scheme for more frequent travellers.

Rolling stock

The Chennai MRTS uses 9-car WAU-4 electrical multiple unit trains, although the 9-car trains are more prevalent during peak hours and from Aug-2015 onwards all services are 9-cars only. The trains use 25 kV overhead catenary for power supply and are broad gauge. A 9-car rake is typified by 3 motor coaches each at the front, the middle and the last. The motors are used to run the wheels of the train at a stipulated speed limit. The MRTS coaches have entry and exit on both sides. The EMU coaches were manufactured by the Integral Coach Factory, Chennai between 1967 and 1969.

Criticism 
Since its construction stages, the Chennai MRTS has had its share of controversies and criticism, including the cost-effectiveness of the route, accessibility, poor maintenance of stations, lack of intermodal transport facility, environmental concerns, budgeting issues and security issues. In light of these issues, which further impacted the line's low ridership, the MRTS has been working incrementally to change its image to Chennai's residents, by addressing and ameliorating the current conditions.

Lack of integration with other modes of transport

Some stations lack proper and safe approach roads, thus deterring passengers from reaching the stations. A study jointly conducted by Southern Railways and CMDA is currently in progress, and the survey results would help to identify the infrastructure problems that hinder ridership on MRTS and Mono Rail on the need to provide infrastructure like ramps, skywalks, nearby bus stops and pedestrians walkways. Access to the Chennai MRTS remains a crucial issue to the line's success, as it does not fully integrate with other modes of transportation in the city,.

Special focus would be on pedestrian facilities that would provide access to MRTS stations from nearby roads and bus stops, apart from identifying new feeder routes for the network. With the completion of connectivity to St. Thomas Mount (expected by 2017), the MRTS will be integrated into the grid of the Chennai Suburban Railway and the Chennai Metro Rail, thus sharing an intermodal transportation interchange with both the systems, when it is expected to reach its full potential due to uninterrupted movement of commuters across different rail lines in the city.

The state and central governments are also working together for the CMRL to takeover the Mass Rapid Transport System (MRTS) so that the latter will get a new shot of blood with modernised stations, integrated ticketing systems, better facilities for passengers, increased frequency of services taking into consideration passenger demands, and also lead to better maintenance.

Inadequate maintenance and usage of station facilities

The system has also been criticised for improper maintenance of stations and the infrastructure and on the windshields of cars parked below the stations, vandalism at several stations, seepage of rainwater through holes in the roofs of stations non-functional station amenities such as lifts and escalators, Station staff have expressed their concern over the Chennai MRTS's safety issues. and conducting various thefts In a recent bid to provide improve the security of the passengers using the network, it has been decided that the MRTS stations would have a single entry and exit point as it has been difficult for the RPF personnel to monitor multiple gates at the same time. According to sources, there is a 20% shortage in the strength of the railway protection force in MRTS stations.

Other issues
The MRTS has been criticised for environmental issues during its construction phase, due to the fact that much of the alignment was built along the banks of the Buckingham Canal. Although the canal itself has been in decline due to fly tipping and sewage the Chennai River Restoration Trust has planned to revitalise and redevelop it. However, a 7.1-km section will remain impassable due to the presence of the MRTS. Another environmental impact caused by the erection of MRTS pillars in the canal is the blocking of the natural flow of storm water during rains. This has led to severe stagnation of rainwater in the neighbourhoods adjoining the canal.

Future plans

Extension to St. Thomas Mount
The cost of the extension was estimated at  4,957 million. However, the line has been repeatedly postponed due to multiple issues during its construction process. and has now escalated to  7,340.1 million. This is because of a change in design due to acquisition issues.

History of construction of extension to St. Thomas Mount
Despite the delays, the extension from Velachery to St. Thomas Mount is currently underway. Track laying is progressing on the first  stretch from Velachery. Of the remaining 1.5 km, the last  from St. Thomas Mount is being constructed simultaneously with Chennai Metro. Litigation had previously prevented the work from being carried out in the last portion of track laying and the work had been stalled for nearly two years. However, a court ruling was passed in favour of the Chennai MRTS. Now Southern Railway has decided that instead of waiting indefinitely for the land acquisition to finish the link up to Mount, it will start running trains to the stations that are completed

 July 2011 Construction of the stations begins. 
 July 2012 According to the Railway Budget 2012, the section would be commissioned by December 2013. 
 October 2012 Land acquisition by CMDA has resumed after the Madras High court vacated a stay and construction work is expected to resume once the acquired land is transferred to the Railways. Land acquisition on the 5-km stretch resumed to be completed in 45 days.
 April 2013 expected to be completed by February 2013 but legal wrangles continue to obstruct the development
 July 2013 The extension of the network has hit a cul de sac near Thillai Ganga Nagar due to difficulty in procuring the land from the locals.
 May 2014 3.7 km of the 5-km stretch of the MRTS line completed. Work is expected to resume, in a month, after the beneficiaries who had approached the High Court against the acquisition of 500 metres of land are expected to be compensated under the Indian government's new Land Acquisition Act, that came into effect on 2014, replacing a 119-year-old obsolete legislation. 
 October 2014 Few of the residents again approached court demanding higher compensation, based on the Land Acquisition Act 2013 - that came into force from 1 January 2014. 
 July 2015 As many as 18 cases filed in Madras High Court to fix the compensation under the new Land Acquisition Act - and the project was not expected to be complete before December, 2016. 
 6 August 2015 the High Court directed the authorities to follow the new law enacted in 2013 that gave better compensation to land owners and to complete the exercise as expeditiously as possible and not later than three months.
 November 2015 Revenue Officials state that land acquisition process had been put on hold as they were engaged in flood-relief work.
 March 2016 Southern Railway General Manager states that MRTS final phase will take at least 18 more months from the date of receiving land (for the last 500 meters) from State Government - which is yet to start the process of acquiring land as per new rates.
 November 2018  discussion between residents and Chennai Metropolitan Development Authority fails again 
 January 2019  Court dismisses a batch of 40 petitions challenging land acquisition for the project 
 July 2019  In nine months,  MRTS extends the service up to Adambakkam  
 August 2019 Railway Minister Piyush Goyal assures MRTS completion in 18 months 
January 2020 Land acquisition problems still continued by Land owners even after the court's order
10 September 2020 Railway officials plans to operate shuttle services in-between the completed stretch of Adambakkam to Velacherry MRTS.
21 September 2020 CMDA Officials Filed a case regarding the Land acquisition once again
31 December 2020 Finally the Buildings present in the last 500 m stretch gets demolished and the land is being ready to handed over to Indian railways for Construction of the last 500 m stretch, and announced soon tender will be floated.
13 January 2021 Commissioner of Rail Safety (CRS) Plans to make an inspection on end of February as requested by the southern railways. Inspection will be done on the completed stretch till Adambakkam Railway Station.
 19 February 2021 Court rejected the case filed by the state government of Tamil Nadu(CMDA) which caused hindrance in Land acquisition and compensation on last 500m stretch. Puzhuthivakkam and Adambakkam Railway stations are nearing completion. Southern Railways plans to extend chennai MRTS till st. Thomas Mount by July 2022 and tenders for the construction of last 500 m will be floated soon with a construction time of 18 months.

Design
Beyond , the alignment would deviate from IRR and would pass through the private built-up areas and terminate at St. Thomas Mount station. There are two stations en route, namely, Puzhithivakkam ( from Velachery) and Adambakkam ( from Velachery). All three stations, including St. Thomas Mount, will be on an elevated structure. Unlike stations on the Tirumailai–Velachery stretch, only minimum passenger amenities will be provided at the stations and no commercial complexes are planned. Due to spatial constraints, the stations are being built in a smaller design, with four staircases with escalators covering both sides of the road.

Benefits
The extension up to St. Thomas Mount is believed to benefit several people including those working in the IT establishments, residences and other offices near to the MRTS network. The patronage of the network is expected to increase significantly with this extension because St. Thomas Mount station will emerge as a single point interchange for 5 different modes of public transport – Public Buses, Southern Railway, the MRTS, Suburban South Line and Metro Line 2 – including a multi level terminal for three different suburban railway networks. Thus, the Mass Rapid Transit System (MRTS) is likely to be the missing link in the proposed three-way integration at St. Thomas Mount railway station when metro rail is up and running by mid-2014. It also has been further decided to terminate long-distance trains there, so that the city traffic may get reduced.

Proposed extension to Villivakkam
The third and fourth phases of the MRTS were initially planned to connect St. Thomas Mount with Villivakkam and Villivakkam with Ennore, respectively. However, with the implementation of the Chennai Metro Rail, the plan for developing these two phases have been dropped, since these overlap with the alignment of the Chennai Metro Rail.

Proposed Chennai to Cuddalore Port coastal railway corridor
In 2008, a proposal was initiated to construct a new railway line from Perungudi MRTS station in Chennai to Pondicherry via Old Mahabalipuram Road (OMR) and East Coast Road (ECR). The line emanating from Perungudi MRTS station is envisaged to be 179 km long and is expected to traverse via Sholinganallur, SIPCOT, Kovalam, Tiruporur, Mamallapuram, Kalpakkam, Koovathur, Cheyyur, Marakkanam, Koonimedu, Kuilappalayam, JIPMER in Pondicherry, Bahour, Varakalpattu, and Tirupadiripuliyur to reach Cuddalore Port Jn. The railway line would run on an embankment. There was also a proposal to extend the line up to Karaikal via Mayiladuthurai. The railway line was sanctioned in the 2007 supplementary budget with an estimated cost of  5,230 million. However, there has been a delay owing to lack of funds and the project is expected to be completed in about 10 years. To expedite the project, the railway board is looking out for multiple options including private contribution, although the model is not yet finalised. There are also alternative plans of beginning or linking the line to Chengalpet. This railway corridor is expected to reduce the travel time between Chennai and Pondicherry to two hours against five hours along the present route via Villupuram. In October 2013, the state government started acquiring land for the 179-km project. At that time the project was estimated to cost  8,000 million.

Merging with Chennai Metro
The MRTS will be merged with Chennai Metro Rail Limited (CMRL) by 2021, for which PricewaterhouseCoopers (PwC) has been appointed as a consultant. Following the merger, the existing suburban trains that the MRTS use will be replaced by air-conditioned trains of Chennai Metro Rail. The fares of MRTS too will be increased to match that of Chennai Metro Rail and the ownership of existing assets of the MRTS will be transferred to CMRL.

In July 2018, PwC said the merger would be a costly affair costing around  3,000 crore to change the trains and other facilities to facilitate the merger.

On 11 May 2022, Southern Railway granted in-principle approval for the Chennai Metro to takeover the MRTS.

Trivia
 MRTS schedules are available on Google Maps or Google Transit and this feature has been extended for Android smartphone devices too.
 SMS tracking facility is to be implemented in MRTS trains. The trains have been fitted with GPS devices and the new method will help finding the position of the trains in real time without human intervention.

See also
 Chennai Suburban Railway
 Chennai Metro
 Rapid transit in India
 Transport in Chennai

References
Notes

Further reading

 "Train to nowhere", Bishwanath Ghosh, The Sunday Diary – 14 October 2012; The Hindu, Chennai
  "MRTS network is a sitting duck", Greeshma Gopal Giri, 20 July 2009; The New Indian Express, Chennai
 " Thugs and goons have run of city MRTS stations", Greeshma Gopal Giri, 17 November 2009; The New Indian Express, Chennai
 " MRTS to get new lease of life", C.Shivakumar, 1 March 2012; The New Indian Express, Chennai
 "Residents protest MRTS alignment change", 3 October 2010; The New Indian Express, Chennai
 " MRTS is in bad shape: Study", C.Shivakumar, 15 October 2011; The New Indian Express, Chennai
 "Rly police ready to offer security cover to MRTS", Greeshma Gopal Giri, 14 July 2009; The New Indian Express, Chennai
 "MRTS services erratic", Yogesh Kabirdoss, 13 October 2011; The New Indian Express, Chennai
 "The pathetic state of the scary MRTS stations", Daniel Thimmayya, 11 October 2011; The New Indian Express, Chennai
 "State non-committal on MRTS", 27 Aug 2009; The New Indian Express, Chennai
 "Where danger lurks for lovers" , Gokul Vannan, 16 June 2010; The New Indian Express, Chennai
 "Local Train Stations Too Far, Unsafe for Women", U Tejonmayan, 4 October 2011; The New Indian Express, Chennai.
 "Southern Railway blames state for MRTS delay", 1 July 2011; The New Indian Express, Chennai
 "Empty space and deserted floors characterise the city’s mrts stations. Toi takes a look at ways to fill them", 26 March 2012, The Times of India, Chennai
 "Locked parking lots and irked commuters", 17 December 2012; The Hindu, Chennai
 "On the fast track" – Description of journey in the last MRTS train service for the day, Aparna Karthikeyan, 18 December 2012; The Hindu, Chennai
 "Plans for ramps, skywalks at MRTS stns remain on paper" – Also discusses the poor safety conditions, lack of bus facility and other usual problems perennially associated with the MRTS. 28 December 2012; The Times of India, Chennai
 "Mapping areas where crimes against women are high" – MRTS stations predominantly feature in this list. Ekatha Ann John. 2 January; The Times of India, Chennai
 "MRTS phase II: land acquisition picks up pace", 13 January 2013; The Hindu, Chennai
 "MRTS to Adambakkam likely by mid-2012". 18 November 2011, Aloysius Xavier Lopez, The Hindu, Chennai
 "Link roads to connect MRTS stations soon", 18 January 2013, The Hindu, Chennai
 "Land acquisition for city’s key projects likely to see end soon". 1 March 2013, The Hindu, Chennai
 "MRTS stations suffer for want of maintenance", 12 March 2013, The Hindu, Chennai
 "Mushrooming slum has residents worried Huts Have Come Up Along Buckingham Canal On OMR" – The Times of India, June 2013, Chennai
 "Crap and garbage piling up like a mountain, toilet water taps on the blink – Pathetic State of Kotturpuram MRTS Station". 29 June 2013, Dinakaran (Tamil), Chennai
 "Reply from Chief Administrative Officer (Construction), Southern Railways – Status of MRTS project and why trains can't be currently operated only up to Adambakkam", 11 July 2013, The Times of India, Chennai
 "MRTS Stations are now dumping yards", 9 Aug 2002, The Hindu, Chennai
 "MRTS worker falls to death in Chennai", 17 July 2013, The Hindu, Tambaram (Chennai)
 "HC declines to shift MRTS station", 22 Aug 2010, The Times of India, Chennai
 "MRTS stations, already in poor shape, turn wet and dirty after the monsoon", 11 Nov 2009. The Times of India, Chennai
 "Velachery-Taramani Rd to come up along MRTS", 11 July 2008, The Times of India, Chennai
 "Acquiring land is key to completion of works by 2013", 16 Mar 2011, The Times of India, Chennai
 "Clogged roads help MRTS traffic double", 13 Nov 2008, The Times of India, Chennai
 "Half-done MRTS stns are a death trap", The Times of India, Chennai
 "Tracking MRTS -As a commuter and a critic, Liffy Thomas brings balance to analysis of the MRTS line", Downtown, The Hindu, 12 August 2013, Chennai
 "Park near Kotturpuram MRTS soon",  The New Indian Express, 13 August 2013, Chennai
 "Increasing patronage but miles to go", Liffy Thomas, 7 Sep 2013, The Hindu, Chennai
 "It’s a name game" – The inauguration of the 18th station "Mundagakanniamman Koil" on the Beach-Velachery MRTS line is delayed due to a raging debate over its name.  T.S. Atul Swaminathan, Downtown, The Hindu, 7 Sep 2013.
 "Toilets a blot on MRTS", Downtown, The Hindu, Chennai, 26 October 2013.
 "Chain snatched at MRTS station", The Hindu, Chennai, 1 November 2013
 "Southern Railway planning to hand over last stage of MRTS project to CMRL",  Deccan Chronicle, Chennai, 7 November 2013
 "Women don’t feel safe at some MRTS stations", The Hindu, Chennai, 12 November 2013
 "EMU shed lies unused in Velachery", The Hindu, Chennai, 12 November 2013
 "MRTS parking lots rented out illegally", The Times of India, Chennai, 11 December 2013
 "Announcements on Chennai MRTS trains a hit", The Hindu, Chennai, 9 December 2013
 "Ups and downs of Chennai's MRTS escalators", The Hindu, Chennai, 13 December 2013
 "3.4-km-long road to connect MRTS stations in Chennai", The Hindu, Chennai, 15 December 2013
 "Defunct lift at Chennai MRTS station proves a nightmare for ill commuter", The Hindu, Chennai, 17 December 2013

External links

 Official Timetable of MRTS, Chennai
 MRTS Chennai Route

Chennai Mass Rapid Transit System
Urban transit in Chennai
5 ft 6 in gauge railways in India
Transport in Chennai